Nikita Pivtsakin (born July 23, 1991) is a Russian professional ice hockey defenceman who is currently an unrestricted free agent. He most recently playied under contract with HC Sochi of the Kontinental Hockey League (KHL).

Playing career
Pivtsakin originally made his professional debut in the KHL with Avangard Omsk in the 2008–09 season.

On June 9, 2018, Pivtsakin was returned to Avangard Omsk in a trade with Metallurg Magnitogorsk, where he split the previous 2017–18 season after an earlier trade with CSKA Moscow.

Following a lone season with HC Spartak Moscow in 2020–21, Pivtsakin opted to sign a one-year contract to join Amur Khabarovsk on 5 May 2021.

Career statistics

Regular season and playoffs

International

References

External links

1991 births
Living people
Amur Khabarovsk players
Avangard Omsk players
HC CSKA Moscow players
KalPa players
Metallurg Magnitogorsk players
Russian ice hockey defencemen
HC Sochi players
HC Spartak Moscow players